Brett R. Lindstrom (born March 23, 1981) is an American politician serving as a member of the Nebraska Legislature from the 18th district. In 2012, he unsuccessfully ran for a Nebraska seat in the U.S. Congress, losing to incumbent Lee Terry in the Republican primary election. In 2014, he was elected to the Nebraska Legislature, representing an Omaha district.

Early life and education

Lindstrom was born in Lincoln, Nebraska. He was raised in Omaha, where he graduated from Millard West High School in 1999. He attended the University of Nebraska–Lincoln, graduating in 2004 with a Bachelor of Science degree in history. At the university, he joined the Nebraska Cornhuskers football team as a walk-on, playing in five games as a back-up quarterback.

Career 
Lindstrom returned to Omaha, where he worked with his father, Dan Lindstrom, as a financial advisor.

2012 congressional election

In 2012, Lindstrom made his first bid for elective office, running for Nebraska's 2nd District seat in the U.S. Congress. He was one of four Republicans challenging the incumbent, Republican Lee Terry; the others were railroad worker Paul Anderson; Glenn Freeman, a onetime Douglas County Republican chairman; and Jack Heidel, chairman of the mathematics department at the University of Nebraska Omaha.

In his campaign, Lindstrom accused Terry of lacking commitment to conservative principles. He took Terry to task for voting for an increase in the United States debt ceiling without demanding a balanced budget amendment in return; and he condemned Terry's efforts to speed approval of the proposed Keystone XL pipeline, calling Terry "unequivocally beholden to corporate lobbyists and special interests" and accusing him of defending "corporate special interests over the Nebraska taxpayer" In debate, Terry counterattacked, declaring that a Lindstrom press release on the pipeline "sounded like it came from the Democratic Party".

Lindstrom led the challengers in fundraising, although his receipts were an order of magnitude less than Terry's. Terry won the Republican primary election with 60.0% of the vote; Lindstrom came in second, with 22.8%, trailed by Heidel with 11.0%, Freeman with 3.9%, and Anderson with 2.2%. Terry went on to win the general election, defeating the Democrats' candidate, Douglas County treasurer John Ewing, by a margin of 50.8%–49.2%.

Nebraska Legislature

2014 election

In 2014, Lindstrom ran for the Nebraska Legislature from the 18th District in northwestern Omaha. Incumbent Scott Lautenbaugh, a Republican, was ineligible to seek re-election under Nebraska's term-limits law.

Four candidates sought the position. Lindstrom, a Republican, described himself as a fiscal conservative. Chad Adams, a carpenter, called himself a "blue-collar, small-government Republican with libertarian leanings". Mike Tesar, a retired Omaha chief deputy prosecutor, had been a Democrat for most of his life, but had re-registered as an independent in 2013; he condemned the Legislature's recent decision not to expand Medicaid under the provisions of the 2010 Affordable Care Act. Joe Vaughn, a chef, stated that he was running as an independent to allow voters to choose someone who was not a member of one of the two major parties, declaring that both were corrupt and represented "the special interests and wealthy donors"; he had unsuccessfully attempted to gather enough signatures to run as an independent in the 2012 2nd District congressional election.

In the nonpartisan primary election, Lindstrom placed first, with 1689 votes, or 45.8% of the total. Tesar came in second, with 1301 votes (35.2%). Vaughn and Adams trailed, with 449 votes (12.2%) and 252 votes (6.8%) respectively.

As the top two vote-getters, Lindstrom and Tesar moved on to the general election, in which taxes figured as a major issue. Lindstrom, calling himself "a committed fiscal conservative", stated that he would work to eliminate the state's income tax, particularly the tax on income from Social Security, and the state's inheritance tax. Tesar called the elimination of many of these taxes impractical, stating that a certain level of taxation was necessary to maintain essential services, among which he included medical care and health insurance for all, an educational system that would enable graduates to obtain good jobs, adequate law enforcement, and alcohol- and drug-treatment programs in prisons.

When the election was held, Lindstrom won the seat, with 4907 votes, or 54.9% of the total; Tesar garnered 4031 votes or 45.1%.

2015 session

In the 2015 session of the Legislature, Lindstrom was appointed to the Banking, Commerce, and Insurance Committee, and to the Natural Resources Committee. He ran for the chair of the Nebraska Retirement Systems Committee, in defiance of an unwritten rule under which freshman legislators did not run for leadership posts, losing by a 24–25 vote to incumbent Jeremy Nordquist. The closeness of the vote was attributed in part to the influx of conservative senators after the 2014 election; Nordquist, a Democrat, had supported the Affordable Care Act and the proposal to expand Medicaid in Nebraska thereunder, and a 2014 referendum that increased the state's minimum wage.

Personal life 
In 2007, he married Leigh Ancona. The couple has three children.

References

External links
Lindstrom's Nebraska Legislature website
Brett Lindstrom for Congress '12. One of two campaign websites found. Archived 2014-06-03 at Wayback Machine
Archived version of second 2012 Lindstrom campaign website.
The Lindstrom Group: financial advisors

1981 births
21st-century American politicians
Living people
Republican Party Nebraska state senators
Politicians from Lincoln, Nebraska
Politicians from Omaha, Nebraska
University of Nebraska–Lincoln alumni